WORM-FM (101.7 FM, "101 The Worm") is a radio station licensed to serve Savannah, Tennessee, United States. The station is owned by Gerald W. Hunt. It airs a country music format.

The station was assigned the WORM-FM call letters by the Federal Communications Commission on March 29, 1979.

References

External links

ORM-FM
Country radio stations in the United States
Hardin County, Tennessee